The first Japanese students in the United Kingdom arrived in the nineteenth century, sent to study at University College London by the Chōshū and Satsuma domains, then the Bakufu (Shogunate). Many went on to study at Cambridge University and a smaller number at Oxford University until the end of the Meiji period. The primary motive for this was an effort to modernise Japan in the long run. Since the 1980s, Japanese students in the United Kingdom have become common thanks to cheaper air travel.

Chōshū Five (1863)

At University College London supervised by Professor Alexander William Williamson

Itō Shunsuke (later Itō Hirobumi) – Genrō, 1st, 5th, 7th, and 10th Prime Minister of Japan
Inoue Monta (later Inoue Kaoru) – Genrō, Minister of Foreign Affairs, Agriculture and Commerce, Home, and Treasury
Nomura Yakichi (later Inoue Masaru) – 1st Director of Railways (Tetsudō-chō)
Endō Kinsuke – Head of Japan Mint (Zōheikyoku)
Yamao Yōzō – Minister of Industry, Director of Cabinet Legislation Bureau

Satsuma students (1865)

15 Satsuma students, one from Tosa and one from Nagasaki, and 4 supervisors (ometsuke). This group also studied at
University College London which was open to students of
all religions.
Niiro Hisanobu(Niiro Chuzō) - Leader of Students, Karō of Satsuma-Han
Matsuki Kōan (later Terashima Munenori) - Minister of Foreign Affairs, and Minister of Education
Godai Tomoatsu (Godai Saisuke) - Founder of Osaka Chamber of Commerce and Industry and Osaka Securities Exchange
Mori Arinori - 1st Minister of Education, Founder of Hitotsubashi University
Machida Hisanari - Ōmetsuke of Satsuma-Han, 1st Curator of Imperial Museum of Japan (later Tokyo National Museum)
Machida Shinsirō - brother of Machida Hisanari
Machida Seizō (later Takarabe Saneyuki) - brother of Machida Hisanari
Hatakeyaka Hatanosuke (later Hatakeyama Yoshinari) - head of Kaisei Gakkō (開成学校, one of predecessor of University of Tokyo), member of Iwakura Mission
Murahashi Hisanari - founder of brewery of Kaitakushi (Hokkaido Development Commission), later Sapporo Brewery
Asakura Moriaki (later Asakura Moriaki) redeveloper of Ikuno Silver Mine
Sameshima Naonobu - Envoy to France
Matsumura Junzō - Vice Admiral of Imperial Japanese Navy, Director of Imperial Japanese Naval Academy
Takami Yaichi (former Ōishi Danzō) formerly rōnin of Tosa-Han, assassin of Yoshida Tōyō
Yoshida Kiyonari - Envoy to USA
Isonaga Hirosuke (later Nagasawa Kanaye) - winemaker of Fountain Grove Winery in California
Nakamura Hironari (or Nakamura Hakuai) - Ministry to Belgium, member of House of Peers
Hori Takayuki - Interpreter of Dutch language in Nagasaki
Nagoya Tokinari
Togo Ainoshin - died in Boshin War

Bakufu students (1866)

Supervisors: 
Kawaji Taro 
Nakamura Keisuke

Students: (12) 
Naruse Jogoro 
Toyama Sutehachi, 
Mitsukuri Keigo 
Fukuzawa Einosuke (no relation of Fukuzawa Yukichi)
Hayashi Tozaburo (later Hayashi Tadasu) 
Ito Shonosuke
Okukawa Ichiro 
Yasui Shinpachiro 
Mitsukuri Dairoku (later Kikuchi Dairoku)
Ichikawa Morisaburo 
Sugi Tokujiro 
Iwasa Genji

Students in the Meiji era

Cambridge University
Kikuchi Dairoku
Suematsu Kenchō
Inagaki Manjirō
Okura Kishichiro
Tanaka Ginnosuke

Oxford University
Yasuhito, Prince Chichibu
Hachisuka Mochiaki
Nanjo Bunyu - professor of Sanskrit at Tokyo University
Takakusu Junjiro

Naval trainees
Prince Arisugawa Takehito
Prince Higashifushimi Yorihito
Tōgō Heihachirō
Yuzuru Hiraga

Other
Hayashi Tadasu 
Takamine Jōkichi

After World War II

Naruhito, Emperor of Japan, Oxford
Masako, Empress of Japan, Oxford
Aiko, Princess Toshi, Eton
Fumihito, Crown Prince of Japan, Oxford
Mako Komuro, University of Edinburgh, University of Leicester 
Princess Kako of Akishino, University of Leeds
Prince Tomohito of Mikasa, Oxford
Princess Tomohito of Mikasa, Rosslyn College
Princess Akiko of Mikasa, Oxford
Hisako, Princess Takamado, Cambridge
Princess Tsuguko of Takamado, University of Edinburgh 
Katsuhiko Oku, Oxford
Hisashi Owada, Cambridge

see also: "For Japan’s royals, studying abroad is freedom"

See also

Rikkyo School in England
Teikyo School United Kingdom
Teikyo University of Japan in Durham
Gyosei International School UK (closed)
Gyosei International College in the U.K. (closed)
Japanese community in the United Kingdom
Japan–United Kingdom relations

References

 Cobbing, Andrew. The Japanese Discovery of Victorian Britain. RoutledgeCurzon, London, 1998. 
 Cobbing, Andrew. The Satsuma Students in Britain: Japan's Early Search for the Essence of the West. Curzon Press, 2000.   
 Japanese Students at Cambridge University in the Meiji Era, 1868-1912: Pioneers for the Modernization of Japan, by Noboru Koyama, translated by Ian Ruxton , (Lulu Press, September 2004).
 Gardiner, Michael. At the Edge of Empire: The Life of Thomas B. Glover. Birlinn, Edinburgh, 2007. 
 The History of the satsuma students , by Satsuma Students Museum

Meiji Restoration
Students in the United Kingdom
 
Japan–United Kingdom relations
S
Students in the United Kingdom
International education industry